Johnsville, also known as Shauck, is an unincorporated community in northern Perry Township, Morrow County, Ohio, United States.  It has a post office with the ZIP code 43349.  It is located at the intersection of U.S. Route 42 with State Route 314.

History
Johnsville was laid out in 1834, and named for John Ely, proprietor. The post office in Johnsville is called Shauck. This post office was established in 1824.

References

Unincorporated communities in Morrow County, Ohio
1834 establishments in Ohio
Populated places established in 1834
Unincorporated communities in Ohio